The African is a 1967 novel by Harold Courlander. By 1978 14,000 hard-cover and 130,000 paperback copies of the book were sold.

Plot
A twelve-year-old African boy, Hwesuhunu, is kidnapped from his homeland by French slave traders, and endures the terrors of the Middle Passage and being sold into slavery. Hwesuhunu is brought to the island of Saint Lucia, and is later sold to a Georgia plantation for US$100. 

He is assigned the new name of Wes Hunu, and spends years as a slave before escaping and living for a time with Native Americans. Hwesuhunu goes to Freedom Island, a refuge located in a swamp, that sheltered escaped slaves. But the refuge is governed by a cruel bully, so Hwesuhunu leaves in search of a better home.

Controversy
The novel became the subject of controversy when it was revealed that author Alex Haley had plagiarized sections of The African for his 1976 novel Roots which later was made into a 1977 television miniseries, a 1979 sequel miniseries, and a 2016 television miniseries remake.

In 1978, Haley paid Harold Courlander and his publisher $650,000 as out-of-court settlement of the lawsuit.

References

English-language novels
1967 American novels
Novels set in Africa
Novels about American slavery
Crown Publishing Group books